Cisnădie (Transylvanian Saxon dialect: De Hielt) is a town in Sibiu County, Transylvania, central Romania, approximately  south of Sibiu. One village, Cisnădioara, is administered by the town.

History 

Cisnădie was mentioned for the first time in a document from the year 1204 under the name "Rivetel".
In the 12th century Saxon colonists settled here and in 1323 the German name Heltau is mentioned. The town flourished, particularly the guilds of blacksmiths and wool weavers (weaving remained the traditional occupation of the town population until the 20th century, when large textile factories were built).

Cisnădie shared most of Transylvania's eventful history. The town suffered several raids, starting with the 1241 raid of the Mongols and continuing with Ottoman attacks. The plague did not spare the town, neither did the fire nor various political agitations throughout the passing of time.

In 1806, under Emperor Franz of Austria, Cisnădie/Heltau renewed its market rights, thus enabling it to prosper.

In 1945, large parts of the German population were deported to the Soviet Union.

In 1948, all factories were nationalized by the communist regime. After its downfall in 1989, most of the factories collapsed. Since the 2000s onwards, the economic situation has been ameliorating.

Demographics 

According to the 2011 census, there was a total population of 13,410 people living in the town. Of these, 97.1% were ethnic Romanians, 1.5% ethnic Germans (more specifically Transylvanian Saxons), 0.7% Hungarians, and 0.3% Romani.

Administration and local politics

Town council 

The town's current local council has the following multi-party political composition, based on the results of the votes cast at the 2020 Romanian local elections:

Natives 

 Teodora Albon, football referee
 Lazăr Baroga, Olympic weightlifter
 Gáspár Heltai, writer and printer

Economy 

In Cisnădie, there are the SC Pralin SRL, the chocolate factory of Florin Bălan.

Sights 

The most important architectural sight of Cisnădie is the fortified complex located in the town center. Originally built in the 12th century as a Romanesque basilica, the church was fortified during the 15th century, after the 1493 Turkish invasion, to protect the local population of Saxons against repeated Ottoman raids. The fortification process included the construction of fortified towers over the two side entrances and the choir, the building of a double structure of defence walls, a moat and several defensive towers along the walls. Simultaneously to the fortification work the church itself suffered a gothicization process. The altar inside the Lutheran church, which forms the center of this complex, is a wing altar/triptych from 1520, realized by the school of Veit Stoss Jr.

The complex is very well preserved and besides being a medieval architectural place of interest, it offers a variety of theme exhibitions: 

 the "Cisnădie/Heltau throughout 12 centuries" Museum located over the old ossarium;
 the Museum of Medieval Defensive Structures located in the northern side tower;
 the Museum of the History of the Communist Era;
 some alternating art expositions.

Cisnădioara village 

Cisnădioara (Transylvanian Saxon dialect: Mächelsbärch) is a village located 2 km west of Cisnădie. Initially, it was listed as one of the ten possessions of the Cistercian abbey at Cârța. The fortified church, dedicated to Saint Michael and built entirely of stone, was first referred to in a document dated 20 November 1223, which mentioned its donation to the abbey. The oldest Romanesque style church in Romania, it stands atop a 100-meter high hill, surrounded by circular fortifications, with a defensive turret above the entrance. 

Some of the original walls have been preserved to this day. The layout of the church, composed of a small basilica with three naves, as well as the decoration of the carved western entrance portal, dating from 1260, attest to the strong influence of Rhineland architecture. Another church in the valley, dedicated to Saint Mary, was first mentioned in 1428 as a Gothic style church, but it was rebuilt in the 18th century in the Baroque style.

Image gallery

Bibliography 

 Augustin Ioan, Hanna Derer. The Fortified Churches of the Transylvanian Saxons. Noi Media Print, 2004

References

External links 

  Official website
  Tur virtual 360 Cetatea Cisnadioara
  Website of the Lutheran Parish - contains history of the fortified complex and description of the expositions

Towns in Romania
Populated places in Sibiu County
Localities in Transylvania